66th Infantry Regiment may refer to:

66th Infantry Regiment (Imperial Japanese Army)
66th Infantry Regiment (United States)